Anthidium mormonum is a species of bee in the family Megachilidae, the leaf-cutter, carder, or mason bees.

Synonyms
Synonyms for this species include:
Anthidium blanditum Cresson, 1879
Anthidium pondreum Titus, 1902
Anthidium pecosense Cockerell, 1904
Anthidium bernardinum var wilsoni Cockerell, 1904
Anthidium bernardinum var fragariellum Cockerell, 1904
Anthidium blanditum praedentatum Cockerell, 1907
Anthidium wallisi Cockerell, 1913
Anthidium nebrascense Swenk, 1914
Anthidium praedentatum trianguliferum Swenk, 1914
Anthidium flavicaudum Cockerell, 1925
Anthidium wyomingense Schwarz, 1927
Anthidium mormonum hicksi Schwarz, 1934
Anthidium wallisi var wallowana Schwarz, 1940

References

External links
Anatomical illustrations

mormonum
Insects described in 1878
Taxa named by Ezra Townsend Cresson